{{Speciesbox
| image = 
| image2 = 
| taxon = Acraea burgessi
| authority = Jackson, 1956 <ref>Jackson, T. H E., 1956 Notes on the Rhopalocera of the Kigezi District of Uganda with descriptions of new species and subspecies J. E Afr. Nat. Hist. Soc.' 23 (1) : 63-102, pl. 1-13</ref>
| synonyms = *Acraea (Actinote) burgessi 
}}Acraea burgessi is a butterfly in the family Nymphalidae. It is found in Uganda (Kigezi) and the Democratic Republic of the Congo (northern Kivu).

TaxonomyAcraea burgessi is a member of the Acraea bonasia species group; see Acraea.

Classification of Acraea by Henning, Henning & Williams, Pierre. J. & BernaudHyalites (group bonasia) Henning, 1993 Acraea (Actinote) (subgroup bonasia) Pierre & Bernaud, 2013Telchinia (Telchinia) Henning & Williams, 2010 Acraea (Actinote)   groupe serena  sub group  bonasia'' Pierre & Bernaud, 2014

References

Butterflies described in 1956
burgessi